Juan Pérez Medina (born 20 October 1960) is a Mexican politician and educator affiliated with the Party of the Democratic Revolution. As of 2014 he served as Deputy of the LIX Legislature of the Mexican Congress as a plurinominal representative.

References

1960 births
Living people
Politicians from Nayarit
Members of the Chamber of Deputies (Mexico)
Party of the Democratic Revolution politicians
Deputies of the LIX Legislature of Mexico